Hank Laventhol (1927–2001) was an American painter and master print maker who made his career in Europe. Born in Philadelphia, Pennsylvania, Laventhol graduated Yale University with a BA in Fine Arts. He did post graduate studies at Columbia University and went into business in New York City. 
At the age of 32, he left for Europe to pursue additional studies in art. He attended the Academy of Fine Arts in Florence, Italy, and eventually spent 10 years in Europe, making his home in Mallorca, Spain. He had four solo shows in London and one-man-exhibitions in Paris, Amsterdam, Copenhagen, Düsseldorf, Brussels, Florence, Zürich, Lausanne and Barcelona.  In the United States his work was seen at five solo shows at the Bodley Gallery in New York City.  He also showed in   other major US cities.

Laventhol’s work is in corporate and private collections, museums and libraries, including The National Gallery of Art, Washington, D.C., Yale University Art Gallery, The Nasher Museum of Art at the Art Museum of Duke University, Durham, N.Carolina, The Print Collection of The New York Public Library, The Free Library of Philadelphia, and La Bibliothèque nationale de France in Paris. Laventhol has been listed in Benezit, the definitive Directory of Painters and Print Makers.
 
Besides painting and sculpting in multiple media, Laventhol published editions of etchings and color aquatints, a demanding and precise process that provided him with  a variety of color and texture, unrivaled by any other etching technique. He owned two etching presses and pulled his own prints. Publishers include Associated American Artists, New York Graphic Society, Original Print Collectors Group Ltd., Pierre Chave, France and George Visat, Paris, who also published graphic editions of, among others, René Magritte, Man Ray, Roberto Matta.

Critics called Laventhol a surrealist. The artist, however, preferred to think of his work as dealing with fantasy realism.

References

External links
 Georges Visat ses livres d'art
 Hank Laventhol: Official Artist Web Site
 Hank Laventhol Surrealistic Art Gallery
 Hank Laventhol - Rochester Institute of Technology - Art on Campus
 Conrad Machine Company - Fine Art Printing Presses
 Gilden's Art

1927 births
2001 deaths
20th-century American painters
American male painters
Yale University alumni
Columbia University alumni
American expatriates in Italy
American expatriates in Spain
20th-century American male artists